Coal in Europe describes the use of coal as an energy fuel in Europe. Coal includes hard coal, black coal, and brown coal.

Coal production in Europe is falling, and imports exceed production. There is, however, growing controversy in Europe over the use of coal, as many denounce it for reasons such as health risks and links to global warming.

Coal supply in the EU 
International Energy Agency reports data for EU28 countries since 1990. According to IEA, EU28 countries use of coal as fuel went from 5,289 TWh in 1990 to 3,057 TWh in 2015, a reduction of 42%. During the same period, coal use in the world increased by 73%. EU28 use of coal:

 1990 – 5,289 TWh
 1995 – 4,246 TWh
 2000 – 3,735 TWh
 2005 – 3,702 TWh
 2010 – 3,293 TWh
 2015 – 3,057 TWh

Coal types 

Coal includes anthracite, bituminous coal, lignite, and peat. Coal from fields differ in ash and moisture content, energy value, volatile elements, sulphur content, and other properties.  Anthracite and bituminous coal are relatively high value compared to lignite and peat, which have lower energy and higher moisture contents. Coal is often used in the iron and steel industry, or to produce energy.

Production and import 

Russia (365 Mt), Germany (176 Mt) and Poland (131 Mt) are the largest producers of coal in Europe as of 2016. Largest net importer was Germany with 53 Mt, and the largest net exporter was Russia with 147 Mt. Largest electricity production from coal in 2016 were in Germany (284 TWh), Russia (159 TWh) and Poland (133 TWh).

Electricity
In 2020 think tank Carbon Tracker estimated that over 80% of coal-fired plants were already more expensive than new renewables and that all of them would be by 2025.

Opposition

Coal, as the largest artificial contributor to carbon dioxide emissions, has been attacked for its detrimental effects on health. Coal has been linked to acid rain, smog pollution, respiratory diseases, mining accidents, reduced agricultural yields and climate change. Proponents of coal downplay these claims and instead advocate the low cost of using coal for energy.

Coal technology has also advanced over the years, and emissions of soot and gases released in the burning of coal have been greatly reduced. New coal pollution mitigation technology, which often refers to carbon capture and storage, is a new and still-developing technology that seeks to capture carbon dioxide from power plants, and prevent it from entering the atmosphere by storing it. Proponents of this approach argue that it can effectively eliminate coal's contributions to climate change, while opponents doubt whether it can be done on a large scale.

The Dutch Research Institute CE Delft estimates that the worldwide "external costs", or hidden costs, of coal in 2007 were €360 billion, excluding the costs of accidents, mining damages, and any loss of cultural heritage or human rights violations that occur as a result of coal production. According to IEA the coal based emissions in 1971–2008 were 303,262 Mt worldwide, 58,210 Mt (19.2%) in OECD Europe, and 5,086 Mt (1.7%) in non-OECD Europe. Europe here excludes European Russia and all the ex-Soviet states. The estimated external costs of coal carbon emissions in 2007 were €69 billion in OECD Europe and €6 billion in non-OECD Europe.

On 20 June 2022, Dutch climate and energy minister Rob Jetten announces that the Netherlands will remove all restrictions on the operation of coal-fired power stations until at least 2024, in response to Russia's refusal to export natural gas to the country. Operations were previously limited to less than a third of the total production.

The coal mining industry also has occupational hazards. In the Komi Republic, Russia, at the centre of the mining industry, occupational diseases are five time more prevalent than in the rest of the Russian Federation. Accidents are also known to happen in coal mines, caused by the liberation of methane from mining.

Accidents 

 Gleision Colliery mining accident UK September 2011
 Suhodolskaya-Vostochnaya coal mine Ukraine July 2011
 2010 Zonguldak mine disaster Turkey May 2010
 Raspadskaya mine explosion Russia, May 2010
 2009 Wujek-Śląsk mine blast Poland, September 2009
 2009 Handlová mine blast Slovakia, August 2009
 Petrila Mine disaster Romania November 2008
 2008 Ukraine coal mine collapse Ukraine June 2008
 2007 Zasyadko mine disaster Ukraine November 2007
 Yubileynaya mine Russia May 2007
 Ulyanovskaya Mine disaster Russia, March 2007
 Luisenthal Mine Germany February 1962
 Marcinelle mining disaster Belgium August 1956
 Courrières mine disaster France March 1906

Climate change 

Annual coal carbon emissions (2005–2008 average) were highest per capita in Europe in Czech Republic 7.4, Kazakhstan 6.9, Poland 5.5, Finland 4.8, Serbia 4.5 and Germany 4.1.

See also 

 Coal mining
 Mine fire
 Mining accident
 Problems in coal mining
 Coal mining in the United Kingdom
 Coal power in the United States

References

External links
 EU Coal Regions in Transition
 Climate Action Network Europe: Coal Phase Out
 Europe Beyond Coal
 European Coal Map
  Climate Analytics
 Powering past coal alliance

 
Europe
European Coal and Steel Community